Brush is a surname. Notable people with the surname include:

Basil Brush, a fictional character in British children's television
Charles F. Brush (1849–1929), United States inventor
George de Forest Brush (1855–1941), United States painter
George Jarvis Brush (1831–1912), United States mineralogist
Henry Brush (1778–1855), United States legislator
Jared M. Brush (1814–1895), former mayor of Pittsburgh, Pennsylvania, United States
Joey Brush (1955-2015), American politician
John T. Brush (1845–1912), United States sports executive
Katharine Brush (1902–1952), United States author
Kathryn Brush, distinguished professor of art history 
Paul Brush (born 1958), English footballer
Richard Brush (born 1984), English footballer